The women's 400 metres at the 2019 World Para Athletics Championships was held in Dubai 7–15 November.

Medalists

Detailed results

T11

T12

T13

T20

T37

T38

T47

T53

T54

See also 
 List of IPC world records in athletics

References 

400 metres
2019 in women's athletics
400 metres at the World Para Athletics Championships